Kaubamajakas is a shopping mall in Pärnu, Estonia. Kaubamajakas is the biggest shopping mall in Pärnu.

Kaubamajakas was opened on 13 May 2004.

Total area of Kaubamajakas is 23,000 m².

In 2007, the center was expanded and the number of tenants increased to 55. During the 2014 expansion, a restaurant floor was added. After the last expansion, the total area of the center is 23,500 square meters, of which 18,400 square meters is leasable. In the new conditions, the center has about 65 shops and service providers.

References

External links
 

Shopping centres in Estonia
Pärnu